Bob Bailey may refer to:

 Bob Bailey (actor) (1913–1983), American radio actor
 Bob Bailey (baseball) (1942–2018), American third baseman in Major League Baseball
 Bob Bailey (ice hockey) (1931–2003), Canadian ice hockey right winger
 Bob Bailey (rugby league), former New Zealand rugby league player and coach
 Bob Bailey (politician) (born 1951), member of the Ontario legislature
 Bobby Bailey, Invisible Children documentary filmmaker

See also
Bobby Bailey (disambiguation)
 Robert Bailey (disambiguation)